Carol Miller (née Devine; born November 4, 1950) is an American farmer and politician who has served as the U.S. representative for West Virginia since 2019; first representing the 3rd congressional district from 2019 to 2023 and the 1st congressional district since 2023. She represented the 15th district in the West Virginia House of Delegates from 2007 to 2013, and the 16th district from 2013 to 2019. She is a member of the Republican Party.

Education
Miller earned a bachelor's degree in history and political science from Columbia College.

West Virginia House of Delegates
Challenging District 15 Democratic representatives Margarette Leach, Kevin Craig, and Jim Morgan, Miller placed in the four-way three-selectee 2004 Republican primary, but lost the six-way three-position general election. (All the incumbents were reelected.)

Challenging the incumbents again, Miller placed in the six-way three-selectee 2006 Republican primary and was elected in the six-way three-position general election, unseating Leach. Craig and Morgan were reelected.

Miller placed first in the three-way Republican primary on May 13, 2008, with 2,116 votes (43.8%). She then placed third in the six-way three-position general election, with 8,163 votes (18.2%), behind Craig and Morgan and ahead of non-selectee candidates Democrat Carl Eastham, and Republicans James Carden and Paula Stewart.

Miller placed first in the three-way Republican primary on May 11, 2010, with 1,505 votes (44.4%). She then placed second in the six-way three-position general election, with 6,601 votes (19.7%), behind Craig and ahead of Morgan and non-selectee candidates Democrat Matthew Woelfel, and Republicans Patrick Lucas and Douglas Franklin.

With all three incumbent District 15 representatives redistricted to District 16, Miller placed first in the Republican primary on May 8, 2012, with 1,745 votes (19.6%). She then placed second in the five-way three-position general election, with 8,415 votes (21.8%), behind Craig and ahead of Morgan and non-selectee candidates Democrat Sean Hornbuckle and Republican Mike Davis.

U.S. House of Representatives

Elections

2018 

On May 8, 2017, incumbent U.S. Representative Evan Jenkins announced his intention to run against incumbent Democratic U.S. Senator Joe Manchin. In August 2017, Miller announced her intention to run to fill Jenkins's seat.

On May 8, 2018, Miller defeated State Delegate Rupie Phillips and State Delegate Marty Gearheart. She received 23.8% of the vote, and won three of the 18 counties in the district. Miller went on to face State Senator Richard Ojeda.

Many polling outlets considered this race Lean Republican or a tossup. On November 6, Miller defeated Ojeda with 56.4% of the vote, winning all but two counties in the district. Upon election, she became the first woman to represent West Virginia's 3rd congressional district and the only Republican woman to be elected to an open seat in 2018.

2020 

Miller was reelected, defeating Russell Siegel in the Republican primary and Hilary Turner in the general election with 71.3% of the vote.

2022 

As a result of redistricting after the 2020 United States Census, Miller's 3rd district was redistricted into the new 1st district. This new 1st district contains all the counties she represented in the old 3rd, along with ten counties from the old 2nd and one county from the old 1st. She announced on the day the map was finalized that she would run for reelection in the new 1st district.  On May 10, 2022, she easily won the Republican Primary with 66% of the primary vote.  She went on to defeat perennial candidate Lacy Watson in the general election with 66.7% of the vote.

Tenure
In December 2020, Miller was one of 126 Republican members of the House of Representatives to sign an amicus brief in support of Texas v. Pennsylvania, a lawsuit filed at the United States Supreme Court contesting the results of the 2020 presidential election, in which Joe Biden defeated incumbent Donald Trump. The Supreme Court declined to hear the case on the basis that Texas lacked standing under Article III of the Constitution to challenge the results of an election held by another state.

During the COVID-19 pandemic, auto dealerships owned by Miller's husband received loans of over $3 million as part of the Paycheck Protection Program (PPP); the loans were later forgiven. Miller voted against the TRUTH Act (H.R. 6782), a bill that would have required public disclosure of companies that received funds through the bailout program.

Miller opposes free trade and supports an America First policy approach on trade that ends trade deals that send jobs overseas.

Committee assignments 
 Committee on Oversight and Reform
 Subcommittee on Civil Rights and Civil Liberties
 Subcommittee on Economic and Consumer Policy
 Committee on Transportation and Infrastructure
 Subcommittee on Coast Guard and Maritime Transportation
 Subcommittee on Economic Development, Public Buildings and Emergency Management
 Subcommittee on Highways and Transit
 Committee on Ways and Means
 Subcommittee on trade
 Subcommittee on worker and family support

Caucus memberships 
 Republican Main Street Partnership
U.S.-Japan Caucus

Personal life 
Miller is a Baptist.

Electoral history

See also
Women in the United States House of Representatives

References

External links
 Congresswoman Carol Miller official U.S. House website
 Campaign website

Carol Miller at Ballotpedia
Carol D. Miller at OpenSecrets

|-

|-

|-

|-

1950 births
21st-century American politicians
21st-century American women politicians
Baptists from West Virginia
Baptists from the United States
Candidates in the 2004 United States elections
Columbia College (South Carolina) alumni
Female members of the United States House of Representatives
Living people
Republican Party members of the West Virginia House of Delegates
Politicians from Columbus, Ohio
Politicians from Huntington, West Virginia
Republican Party members of the United States House of Representatives from West Virginia
Women state legislators in West Virginia